Bedtime Stories is the first solo album by David Baerwald, an Ohio-born musician, singer, and composer who was formerly a member of the successful duo David + David along with David Ricketts.

Bedtime Stories was released in May 1990 on the A&M Records label, and was produced by Baerwald along with Larry Klein, Steve Berlin, and Matt Wallace.

Critical reception
On Allmusic.com, "Bedtime Stories" rates 4.5 out of 5 stars, and is described as "a bracing collection that shines a light on desperate situations and characters with great dignity and musicianship."

Track listing

Personnel
 David Baerwald – vocals, guitars, keyboards
 Larry Klein – bass, guitars, keyboards
 Vinnie Colaiuta – drums
 Mike Urbano – drums 
 Rich Stekol – acoustic guitar
 Greg Leisz – steel guitar
 Gene Elders – violin
 Steve Lindsey – Hammond organ
 Bill Dillon – guitar on "Sirens in the City”
 Steve Berlin – sax on "Collette”
 Alejandro (Alex) Acuna – percussion on "In the Morning”
 Tommy Funderburk – background vocals on "Walk Through Fire”
 Maxine Waters – vocals and background vocals on "The Best Inside You”
 Joni Mitchell – background vocals on "Liberty Lies”
 Tower of Power Horns – baritone sax, trumpets, and tenor saxes on "Dance”

References

External links
  Bedtime Stories at Discogs.com

1990 albums
David Baerwald albums